Erythranthe breviflora is a species of monkeyflower known by the common name shortflower monkeyflower. It is native to western North America from British Columbia to Wyoming to the Modoc Plateau and northern Sierra Nevada in  California. It grows in moist areas in several types of habitat. It was formerly known as Mimulus breviflorus.

Description
Erythranthe breviflora is a lightly hairy annual herb producing a thin, erect stem up to 17 centimeters tall. The paired leaves have oval-shaped blades borne on petioles, each with a total length under 3 centimeters. The tiny tubular yellow flower is a few millimeters long. Its corolla is divided into five lobes at the mouth.

References

External links
Jepson Manual Treatment - Mimulus breviflorus
USDA Plants Profile: Mimulus breviflorus
Mimulus breviflorus - Photo gallery

breviflora
Flora of California
Flora of Oregon
Flora of the Northwestern United States
Flora of the Great Basin
Flora of the Sierra Nevada (United States)
Plants described in 1901
Flora without expected TNC conservation status